Bath Township is one of the twelve townships of Greene County, Ohio, United States. As of the 2010 census, the township population was 39,392, of whom 7,823 lived in the unincorporated portions.

Geography
Located in the northwestern corner of the county, it borders the following townships and cities:
Bethel Township, Clark County – north
Mad River Township, Clark County – northeast
Miami Township – east
Xenia Township – southeast
Beavercreek Township – south
Riverside – southwest
Dayton – west
Huber Heights – northwest

Several populated places are located in Bath Township:
Part of the city of Beavercreek, in the southwest
Most of the city of Fairborn, in the center, which includes the former village of Osborn
Most of Wright-Patterson Air Force Base, a census-designated place, in the west
Part of the city of Huber Heights in the west
The unincorporated community of Byron, in the southeast

Name and history
Bath Township was organized in 1807. The township was named after Bath, Maine (which was named after the English city of Bath). One of the early settlers came from the city in Maine.  Statewide, other Bath Townships are located in Allen and Summit counties.

The first settlers in Bath Township were members of the Mercer family, who immigrated from Virginia. The precise date of their arrival is unknown, but it seems certain that crops were being raised in the township before George Washington died in 1799. The Mercer Log House still stands and is listed on the National Register of Historic Places.

Government
The township is governed by a three-member board of trustees, who are elected in November of odd-numbered years to a four-year term beginning on the following January 1. Two are elected in the year after the presidential election and one is elected in the year before it. There is also an elected township fiscal officer, who serves a four-year term beginning on April 1 of the year after the election, which is held in November of the year before the presidential election. Vacancies in the fiscal officership or on the board of trustees are filled by the remaining trustees.

Surrounding communities

References

External links
Bath Township official website
County website

Townships in Greene County, Ohio
1807 establishments in Ohio
Townships in Ohio